Santiago Martín Maidana (born 2 February 1991) is an Argentine professional footballer who plays as a midfielder.

References

External links

1991 births
Living people
Argentine footballers
Association football midfielders
Argentine expatriate footballers
Expatriate soccer players in the United States
Argentine expatriate sportspeople in the United States
USL Championship players
FC Tulsa players
Sportspeople from Buenos Aires Province